Platylesches panga is a butterfly in the family Hesperiidae. It is found in western Uganda, the Democratic Republic of the Congo (Shaba) and western Tanzania.

References

Butterflies described in 1937
Erionotini